Kristopher King (born February 18, 1966) is a Canadian former professional ice hockey forward who played 14 seasons in the National Hockey League (NHL) for the Detroit Red Wings, New York Rangers, Winnipeg Jets, Phoenix Coyotes, Toronto Maple Leafs, and the Chicago Blackhawks.  He won the King Clancy Memorial Trophy in 1996. He also started the Kris King Hockey School summer camp in Gravenhurst, Ontario in 1987.

King now works for the National Hockey League as Senior Vice President of Hockey Operations for the NHL's central office in Toronto.

Career statistics

See also
List of NHL players with 2000 career penalty minutes

External links
 

1966 births
Chicago Blackhawks players
Detroit Red Wings players
King Clancy Memorial Trophy winners
Living people
New York Rangers players
People from Bracebridge, Ontario
Peterborough Petes (ice hockey) players
Phoenix Coyotes players
Toronto Maple Leafs players
Washington Capitals draft picks
Winnipeg Jets (1972–1996) captains
Winnipeg Jets (1979–1996) players
Canadian ice hockey left wingers